Registration tax may refer to:

 Vehicle registration tax (Ireland) – the tax payable in Ireland to first register a motor vehicle.
 Vehicle first registration fee – the tax payable in the United Kingdom to first register a motor vehicle.
 Road tax in the United States and Australia.